Bahadurgad ("Bahadur Fort") is a fort in the Pedgaon village of Ahmednagar district in Maharashtra, India.

Location
The fort is located about 100 km from Pune. The nearest town is Daund. This fort lay about 15 km East of the Daund town  on northern banks of River Bhima. The Fort is situated in the village Pedgaon.

Places to see
The fort is rectangular in shape with two entrance gates. The gate towards the village is in good condition while that towards the river is in ruined state. There is a 5 feet tall Maruti/Hanuman statue inside the fort along with group of 5 temples which were constructed during Yadav period. The Hemadpanti architecture temples are of Baleshwar, Lakshmi-Narayan, Mallikarjun, Rameshwar and Bhairavnath. There are many heroic stones, Satigal, cannon balls, Deepmal and a statue of Shiva in front of the Bhairavnath temple.

History
Very less history of this fort is known. During the Moghul Empire, Pedgaon was one of the chief stores and a frontier post of the Moghul Army. In 1672 Deccan Viceroy Khan Jahan camped here and tried to pursuit Maratha army headed by Shivaji Maharaj. Khan Jahan built water Channel for bringing water from the river Bhima. The Mot and the Persian wheel are well preserved till now. Khan Jahan renamed Pedgaon as Bahadurgad. This fort was captured by Shivaji Maharaj by fooling the Moghul Chief. There is a 2 storied palace of Aurangzeb inside the fort. It is believed that Sambhaji Maharaj met Aurangzeb in this palace.  In 1759 Pedgaon was captured by Sadashivrao Bhau Peshwa and remained with the Marathas till 1818.

References

External links 
 

Buildings and structures of the Maratha Empire
Forts in Maharashtra
16th-century forts in India